The Redwood Empire Ice Arena (commonly known as Snoopy's Home Ice) is an indoor ice rink in Santa Rosa, California, United States. It was owned and built by Peanuts cartoonist Charles M. Schulz, and it opened on April 28, 1969. It was originally conceived, designed, and operated by his first wife Joyce Schulz.

The Arena offers public skating, private ice time, figure skating, junior hockey, and adult hockey. It is also host to the annual Snoopy's Senior World Hockey Tournament, in which 64 senior teams from all over the world come to Santa Rosa for a week-long hockey tournament in the summer. The arena has about 500 permanent seats for hockey games, but this can be expanded to 3,000 seats for concerts and other events. The arena is also home to the junior hockey Santa Rosa Flyers, the Cardinal Newman High School hockey team, and the Santa Rosa Figure Skating Club.

The Arena, located just down the street from the Charles M. Schulz Museum and Research Center, features The Warm Puppy Café, which serves cafe drinks and meals.

Across the parking lot from the Arena is Snoopy's Gallery and Gift Shop where people can buy Peanuts-related products as well as figure skating and hockey equipment.

In the summer of 2019, the ice rink was closed and underwent renovations for the first time since the arena opened a half-century earlier. The rink re-opened in November.

The ice arena is also the home of the Santa Rosa Growlers, a new Senior A team in the Mountain West Hockey League.

Public transportation 
Santa Rosa CityBus lines 6 and 10 serve the arena.

References

External links 

 

Sports venues in Sonoma County, California
Music venues in the San Francisco Bay Area
Charles M. Schulz
Sports in Santa Rosa, California
Buildings and structures in Santa Rosa, California
Indoor ice hockey venues in California
Companies based in Santa Rosa, California
1969 establishments in California
Sports venues completed in 1969
Tourist attractions in Santa Rosa, California